Periclimenes imperator, known as the emperor shrimp, is a species of shrimp with a wide distribution across the Indo-Pacific. It lives commensally on a number of hosts, including the sea slug Hexabranchus.

References

External links

Palaemonidae
Crustaceans described in 1967
Taxa named by Alexander James Bruce